Palazzo Loredan dell'Ambasciatore is a late 15th-century Gothic palace in Venice, Italy, that once belonged to the noble Loredan family. Located in the Dorsoduro sestiere (quarter), it was called "dell'Ambasciatore" because it was offered as a home of the ambassadors of the Austrian Empire to the Republic by Doge Francesco Loredan.

History

One Loredan ancestor, Antonio, was the administrator of Corfu who defeated the Turks in 1716, together with Count Johann Matthias von der Schulenburg, a Saxon general. After the battle, Count Schulenburg set up house inside the Loredan Palace, along with 25 members of his entourage and four gondoliers, and was known for his illustrious dinner parties and admirable art collection.

In 1752, another ancestor, Francesco Loredan, who later was  Doge, offered the palazzo as a residence for the Ambassador of the Holy Roman Empire in exchange for 29 years of restorations. The first Imperial Ambassador to live there was Count Philip Joseph Orsini-Rosenberg who, after his arrival in Venice, married Giustiniana Wynne, a close friend of Giacomo Casanova.  The couple resided together in Palazzo Loredan dell'Ambasciatore during the first years of their marriage.

These days, the Palazzo Loredan dell'Ambasciatore is owned by the Gaggia family.

References

Sources

External links
Images of the palace
Palazzo Loredan dell'Ambasciatore Rental

Houses completed in the 15th century
Loredan dell'Ambasiatore
Loredan dell'Ambasciatore
Gothic architecture in Venice
Venetian Gothic architecture